Surya Kumar Neupane (born 1987) known professionally as Uttam Neupane, is a Nepali sound mixer. He is the recipient of the 5th National Film Award of Nepal for Best Sound mixing for the feature film Mero Euta Saathi Chha. Two films he did sound-mixing for, Bulbul and Talakjung vs Tulke, were Nepal's official entries for the 92nd and 88th Academy Awards respectively.

Career 
Neupane worked on the short film Dadyaa, which was nominated for Short Film Grand Jury Prize at the Sundance Film Festival and won a Special Jury Award. He also worked with CNN journalist Benjamin Best on his documentary film Dirty Games. It won Feature Documentary Award of Recognition at the Hollywood international independent documentary awards in 2016, Best Documentary at Snowdance Independent Film Festival, New York festivals.

Neupane also worked on Talakjung vs Tulke directed by Nischal Basnet, which was chosen as Nepal’s Official entry in best foreign language film category at the 88th Academy Awards. Neupane and Basnet have also collaborated on Loot (2012 film) and Loot 2. He is also known for his work on Bulbul (2019) directed by Binod Poudel, which was selected as the Nepalese entry for Best International Feature Film at the 92nd Academy Awards, and won Special Jury Award at the 9th SAARC Film Festival. 

Neupane mixed sound on the first Nepali science fiction movie Bijuli Machine in 2016, directed by Navin Awal. Bijuli Machine was selected as an opening film at the 2017 Tasveer South Asian Film Festival, Seattle and won the best narrative film that year. It also screened at Singapore South Asian International Film Festival and was selected for the Chicago South Asian Film Festival.

Filmography, awards & nominations

References

External links
 

1987 births
Living people
Nepalese film people
People from Rautahat District
Audio production engineers
Sound designers